"Every Once in a While" is a song recorded by American country music band  Blackhawk.  It was released in April 1994 as the second single from their self-titled debut album.  It peaked at number 2 on the U.S. Billboard Hot Country Singles & Tracks chart, and at number 3 on Canadian RPM Country Tracks chart. The song was written by all three members of the band.

Content
The song's narrator asks a former lover if she still thinks about him, and she says every once in a while. In reality she constantly thinks about their old relationship and wants to return to the way things were.

Critical reception
Deborah Evans Price of Billboard magazine reviewed the song favorably, saying that the trio "blends sharp hooks and heavenly harmony on this satisfying sophomore single." She goes on to say that Paul's voice "grows on you, and that's a good thing, because it looks like BlackHawk is going to be around for a while."

Music video
The music video was directed by Michael Oblowitz.

Chart performance
"Every Once in a While" debuted at number 74 on the Billboard Hot Country Singles & Tracks chart for the week of April 16, 1994, and peaked at number 2 on the week of July 23, 1994.

Year-end charts

References

1994 singles
1994 songs
Blackhawk (band) songs
Songs written by Van Stephenson
Arista Nashville singles
Song recordings produced by Mark Bright (record producer)
Songs written by Dave Robbins (keyboardist)
Songs written by Henry Paul (musician)